Barry Keoghan (born 18 October 1992) is an Irish actor. He is known for his roles on screen, appearing in independent films and blockbuster films. In 2020, he was listed at number 27 on The Irish Times list of Ireland's greatest film actors.

His early film roles include '71 (2014), Mammal (2016), and Trespass Against Us (2016). He received acclaim in 2017 for his roles in Christopher Nolan's Dunkirk and Yorgos Lanthimos's The Killing of a Sacred Deer, receiving a Independent Spirit Award nomination for the latter. He continued acting in American Animals (2018), Calm with Horses (2019), receiving a BAFTA Award for Best Actor in a Supporting Role nomination, and The Green Knight (2021). In 2021, he appeared as Druig in the Marvel Cinematic Universe film Eternals. In 2022 he appeared in Martin McDonagh's The Banshees of Inisherin, for which he won the BAFTA Award for Best Actor in a Supporting Role and received nominations for the Golden Globe and Academy Award for Best Supporting Actor.

He is also known for his television roles, including the RTÉ drama Love/Hate (2013) and the HBO miniseries Chernobyl (2019). Keoghan is an ambassador for Dior and Barretstown.

Early life and career 
Keoghan was born on 18 October 1992, and grew up in Summerhill, Dublin, Ireland. His mother struggled with drug addiction throughout her adult life and died when he was 12. With his brother Eric, he spent seven years in foster care, in 13 foster homes before they were raised by their grandmother, aunt, and older sister Gemma.

As a child, Keoghan appeared in school plays in the O'Connell School on Dublin's North Richmond Street but was banned for "messing about". He attributes his film education to sneaking into films with friends at Cineworld, Parnell Street, from which he was eventually barred.

Keoghan started his acting career in 2011 by answering a casting notice in a Sheriff Street shop window for the crime film Between the Canals, portraying Aido in a small role in the film, which was released in 2011. He then studied acting at The Factory, a local Dublin acting school. He remembers "not even having €2.20 to get the bus to The Factory" at the time. The same year, at the age of 18, he appeared in the Irish soap opera Fair City.

In 2013, Keoghan appeared as Wayne on Love/Hate. The role earned Keoghan recognition in Ireland, and he went on to feature in '71 in 2014 and Mammal and Trespass Against Us in 2016.

Keoghan appeared in two films in 2017. He featured as George Mills in Dunkirk and starred as Martin Lang in The Killing of a Sacred Deer alongside Colin Farrell and Nicole Kidman. He won the Irish Film and Television Award for Best Supporting Actor for his work in The Killing of a Sacred Deer. The following year, he appeared in Black '47 as Hobson, an English soldier stationed in Ireland during the Great Famine. He also starred in American Animals the same year. He portrayed Spencer Reinhart in the film, based on a real-life theft of rare books from a university library. In 2018, The Hollywood Reporter described Keoghan as "the next big thing" for his film work in the previous three years and in 2019 he was nominated for the BAFTA Rising Star Award.

He appeared in the 2019 mini-series Chernobyl. He starred in an episode of Living With Lucy in September 2019. That same month, Calm With Horses premiered at the Toronto International Film Festival. In July 2018, Keoghan was cast as lead character Yorick Brown in the pilot of Y: The Last Man but exited the main series production in February 2020. Keoghan played Druig in the Marvel Cinematic Universe film Eternals in November 2021. He also appeared in The Green Knight.

Keoghan appeared in Matt Reeves' film The Batman (2022) credited as "Unseen Arkham Prisoner" and Reeves later confirmed that Keoghan was the Joker. On 24 March 2022, three weeks after the film's release, Warner Bros. released a deleted scene featuring Keoghan's Joker and Robert Pattinson's Batman. Keoghan received an Academy Award for Best Supporting Actor nomination, and won  BAFTA Award for Best Actor in a Supporting Role for his performance in the 2022 film The Banshees of Inisherin.

Personal life 
Keoghan is an amateur boxer. From 2017 to 2020 Keoghan was in a relationship with Killarney native Shona Guerin, whom he had met on Good Friday in a Killarney pub in which she was working. The pair appeared on Livin' with Lucy together in 2019 in which Lucy Kennedy stayed with them in their Los Angeles home. In September 2021 Keoghan began dating Alyson Kierans, a dentist whose father is from County Cavan. A few months later, on Ireland's Mother's Day, 27 March 2022, he announced that the couple were expecting a child together. The birth of their son, Brando, was announced on 8 August 2022. In March 2022, Keoghan was announced as the new ambassador for the Barretstown children's charity, and helped open the charity's new Aladina Studio funded by the Spanish Aladina Foundation.

Keoghan and his family moved to Broughty Ferry, near Dundee, Scotland in November 2022.

Filmography

Film

Television

Awards and nominations

References

External links 
 
 Irish Film and Television Network: IFTN talks with Dunkirk actor Barry Keoghan

1992 births
21st-century Irish male actors
Best Supporting Actor BAFTA Award winners
Irish male film actors
Irish male television actors
Living people
Male actors from Dublin (city)
People educated at O'Connell School